William Benjamin Fauver (born March 2, 1954 in Cleveland, Ohio) is an American former pair skater.

Career 
Early in his career, Fauver competed in junior pairs with Susan Jackson. By 1972, he was competing in junior pair skating with Patty Morton.

Fauver competed in senior pair skating with partner Alice Cook. They won the silver medal at the 1976 U.S. Championships and represented the United States at the 1976 Winter Olympics where they placed 12th.

After several years away from competition, Fauver returned with new partner Lee Ann Miller. They won three silver medals at the U.S. national championships (1981, 1983, 1984) and the 1982 bronze medal. They represented the United States at the 1984 Winter Olympics, where they placed 10th.

Competitive highlights

Pairs with Lea Ann Miller

Pairs with Alice Cook

Junior Pairs with Morton

Novice Pairs with Jackson

References

Sports-Reference.com profile
 

1954 births
Living people
American male pair skaters
Figure skaters at the 1976 Winter Olympics
Figure skaters at the 1984 Winter Olympics
Olympic figure skaters of the United States
Sportspeople from Cleveland
20th-century American people
21st-century American people